Hypercube-based NEAT, or HyperNEAT, is a generative encoding that evolves artificial neural networks (ANNs) with the principles of the widely used NeuroEvolution of Augmented Topologies (NEAT) algorithm developed by Kenneth Stanley. It is a novel technique for evolving large-scale neural networks using the geometric regularities of the task domain. It uses Compositional Pattern Producing Networks  (CPPNs), which are used to generate the images for Picbreeder.org  and shapes for EndlessForms.com . HyperNEAT has recently been extended to also evolve plastic ANNs  and to evolve the location of every neuron in the network.

Applications to date 

 Multi-agent learning
 Checkers board evaluation
 Controlling Legged Robotsvideo
 Comparing Generative vs. Direct Encodings
 Investigating the Evolution of Modular Neural Networks
 Evolving Objects that can be 3D-printed
 Evolving the Neural Geometry and Plasticity of an ANN

References

External links
HyperNEAT Users Page
Ken Stanley's website
"Evolutionary Complexity Research Group at UCF"
NEAT Project Homepage
PicBreeder.org 
EndlessForms.com 
BEACON Blog: What is neuroevolution?

Artificial neural networks
Evolutionary algorithms
Evolutionary computation
Genetic algorithms